The 1990 Hockey East Men's Ice Hockey Tournament was the 6th Tournament in the history of the conference. It was played between March 1 and March 11, 1990. Quarterfinal games were played at home team campus sites, while the final four games were played at the Conte Forum in Chestnut Hill, Massachusetts, the home venue of the Boston College Eagles. This was the final year the Hockey East championship was decided at a home venue to one of its member teams until 2021. By winning the tournament, Boston College received the Hockey East's automatic bid to the 1990 NCAA Division I Men's Ice Hockey Tournament.

Format
The tournament featured three rounds of play. In the first round, the first and eighth seeds, the second and seventh seeds, the third seed and sixth seeds, and the fourth seed and fifth seeds played a best-of-three with the winner advancing to the semifinals. In the semifinals, the highest and lowest seeds and second highest and second lowest seeds play a single-elimination game, with the winners advancing to the championship game and the losers meeting in a third-place game. The tournament champion receives an automatic bid to the 1990 NCAA Division I Men's Ice Hockey Tournament.

Conference standings
Note: GP = Games played; W = Wins; L = Losses; T = Ties; PTS = Points; GF = Goals For; GA = Goals Against

Bracket

Teams are reseeded after the quarterfinals

Note: * denotes overtime period(s)

Quarterfinals

(1) Boston College vs. (8) Merrimack

(2) Maine vs. (7) Lowell

(3) Boston University vs. (6) Northeastern

(4) Providence vs. (5) New Hampshire

Semifinals

(1) Boston College vs. (5) New Hampshire

(2) Maine vs. (3) Boston University

Championship

(1) Boston College vs. (2) Maine

Tournament awards

All-Tournament Team
F David Emma (Boston College)
F Martin Robitaille* (Maine)
F Jean-Yves Roy (Maine)
D Greg Brown (Boston College)
D Claudio Scremin (Maine)
G Scott LaGrand (Boston College)
* Tournament MVP(s)

References

External links
Hockey East Online

Hockey East Men's Ice Hockey Tournament
HE tournament